Kádár is a Hun judge mentioned in Hungarian chronicles. He is said to have moved with the other Huns from Scythia to Pannonia, where his fellow countrymen appointed him judge among themselves. 

Mark of Kalt, in the Chronicon Pictum, wrote:

His name could be associated with the word karcha, which at the time meant "judge". Alternatively, it could derive from a Khazar title (similar to the later Hungarian title of count palatine) used for a Khazar dignitary.

References

Hungarian mythology
Huns
Hungarian people